The Râșca is a right tributary of the river Moldova in Romania. It discharges into the Moldova near Praxia. Its former lower course, the Râșca, discharges into the Moldova further downstream.

References

Rivers of Romania
Rivers of Suceava County